Wittmer is a surname. Notable people with the surname include:

 Albert Wittmer (1897–1950), American football and basketball player, lawyer, and state legislator
 Jeffrey Wittmer (born 1984), American weightlifter
 Kuno Wittmer (born 1982), Canadian racing driver
 Phil Wittmer, American information technology specialist

See also
 William A. Wittmer Lustron House
 Whitmer (disambiguation)